Wilson County Schools is a K–12 school district in Wilson County, Tennessee, United States. The district enrolls nearly 20,000 students and over 1,100 teachers at ten elementary schools, three K-8 schools, four middle schools, and five high schools.  

Students who live within the K–8 Lebanon Special School District (LSSD) automatically transition to Lebanon High School in Wilson County Schools after completing their eighth-grade year. Wilson County Schools is the ninth largest school district in the state.

History and Notable Events
During the 2020 Nashville tornado, which struck Mt. Juliet, West Wilson Middle and Stoner Creek Elementary sustained catastrophic damage and were closed for the next two school years. Both schools had to be rebuilt, with demolition and construction starting in 2021.

Administrators
 Mr. Jeff Luttrell, Director of Schools

School board
The Wilson County School Board consists of seven board members serving seven zones, each of whom are elected to serve a four-year term.

 Carrie Pfeiffer, Zone 1
 Dr. Beth Meyers, Zone 2
 Melissa Lynn, Zone 3
 Joseph Padilla, Zone 4
 Larry Tomlinson, Zone 5
 Kimberly McGee, Zone 6
 Jamie Farough, Zone 7

Schools

High schools (9–12) 
 Mt. Juliet High School (1854)
 Lebanon High School (1918)
 Watertown High School (1912)
 Wilson Central High School (1999)
 Green Hill High School (2020)

K–8 schools 
 Carroll-Oakland Elementary (1978)
 Southside Elementary (1967)
 Tuckers Crossroads Elementary (1914)

Middle schools (6–8) 
 Gladeville Middle School (2019) 
 Mt. Juliet Middle School (2002)
 West Wilson Middle School (1976; rebuilt 2022)
 Watertown Middle School (2014)

Elementary schools (K–5) 
 Elzie Patton Elementary (2008)
 Rutland Elementary (1998)  
 Gladeville Elementary (1833)
 Lakeview Elementary (1969)
 Mt. Juliet Elementary (1948)
 Springdale Elementary (2017)
 Stoner Creek Elementary (1987; rebuilt 2022)
 W.A. Wright Elementary (1991)  
 Watertown Elementary (1959) 
 West Elementary (1959)

Specialty schools 
 Barry Tatum Academy
 Wilson County Adult High School (1992)
 Wilson County Adult Learning Center

References

External links 
 Wilson County Schools Website
 Wilson County Schools Facebook

School districts in Tennessee
Education in Wilson County, Tennessee
Educational institutions with year of establishment missing